There are currently no operational narrow-gauge railway lines in Croatia. In some cities there are still metre-gauge tram networks.

Metre gauge 
Osijek–Donji Miholjac, 51 km, closed 1970.

Bosnian gauge 
Parenzana railway, Trieste (Italy) – Capodistria–Koper (Slovenia)–Parenzo (Poreč, Croatia). Dismantled, in formerly Italian territory. Single track, 122,88 km.
Samoborček railway, Zagreb–Samobor via Podsused. Single track, 19 km. Later extended to Bregana, now dismantled.
 The former Steinbeis railway starting in Knin and crossed the border to Bosnia and Herzegovina, replaced with the standard-gauge "Unska pruga" route in 1948.
  railway, Split–Sinj, dismantled 1963
 Railway from Gabela to Zelenika
Branch: Uskoplje–Dubrovnik–Gruž

Decauville 
Raša (Štalije)–Mine, single track, ~ 7 km
Plomin Luka to mine, single track, ~12 km

Metre-gauge trams
Current
Osijek tram system
Zagreb Tramway
Former
Dubrovnik tram
Opatija tram
Trams in Pula
Trams in Rijeka

Narrow gauge railways in Croatia